Henry Coldston or Goldstone (by 1498–1547), was an English politician. He was Mayor of Salisbury from 1537–1538. He was a Member (MP) of the Parliament of England for Salisbury in 1539.

Early life 
Henry Coldston was christened near Warminster, Wiltshire.

Later life 
He was buried at St. Edmund's church.

References

15th-century births
1547 deaths
English MPs 1539–1540
People from Salisbury
Mayors of Salisbury